Teucholabis is a genus of crane fly in the family Limoniidae.

Species
Subgenus Euparatropesa Alexander, 1947
T. amatrix Alexander, 1945
T. amoena (Alexander, 1922)
T. angustifascia Alexander, 1968
T. clavistyla Alexander, 1979
T. esakii (Alexander, 1924)
T. fasciolaris (Wiedemann, 1828)
T. laetabilis Alexander, 1952
T. heteropoda Alexander, 1943
T. invenusta Alexander, 1947
T. jactans (Alexander, 1913)
T. laetifica Alexander, 1948
T. lindneri Alexander, 1933
T. martinezi Alexander, 1962
T. praenobilis Alexander, 1945
T. sanguinolenta Alexander, 1938
T. witteana Alexander, 1956
T. xystophanes (Alexander, 1921)
Subgenus Euteucholabis Alexander, 1947
T. nepenthe Alexander, 1947
T. paradoxa Alexander, 1913
Subgenus Paratropesa Schiner, 1866
T. chalybeia Alexander, 1927
T. collaris (Osten Sacken, 1888)
T. inouei Alexander, 1955
T. laneana Alexander, 1959
T. neocollaris Alexander, 1944
T. nigrocoxalis Alexander, 1936
T. nodulifera Alexander, 1949
T. paracollaris Alexander, 1945
T. placabilis Alexander, 1941
T. praeusta (Osten Sacken, 1886)
T. singularis (Schiner, 1868)
T. subchalybeia Alexander, 1979
T. subcollaris Alexander, 1940
Subgenus Teucholabis Osten Sacken, 1860

T. aberrans Alexander, 1923
T. adamesi Alexander, 1979
T. aequinigra Alexander, 1941
T. amapana Alexander, 1959
T. amblyphallos Alexander, 1966
T. analis Alexander, 1955
T. angustapicalis Alexander, 1938
T. angusticapitis Brunetti, 1918
T. angustifusca Alexander, 1980
T. annulata Williston, 1896
T. annuloabdominalis Senior-White, 1921
T. anthracina Alexander, 1921
T. argentea Alexander, 1927
T. aspilota Alexander, 1948
T. atahualpa Alexander, 1968
T. atripennis Alexander, 1940
T. atrolata Alexander, 1948
T. audax Alexander, 1913
T. azuayensis Alexander, 1946
T. biacifera Alexander, 1949
T. biarmillata Alexander, 1948
T. bicolor Osten Sacken, 1881
T. bidentifera Alexander, 1966
T. bigladius Alexander, 1942
T. biramosa Alexander, 1940
T. brevisetosa Alexander, 1941
T. bruneri Alexander, 1926
T. cariosa Alexander, 1969
T. carolinensis Alexander, 1916
T. catharinensis Alexander, 1931
T. chalybeiventris (Loew, 1861)
T. cinderella Alexander, 1969
T. cinereiceps Alexander, 1928
T. circumscripta Alexander, 1945
T. cocaensis Alexander, 1980
T. cockerellae Alexander, 1915
T. colomelania Alexander, 1968
T. complexa Osten Sacken, 1860
T. confluenta Alexander, 1925
T. confluentoides Alexander, 1931
T. cuneiformis Alexander, 1947
T. cybele Alexander, 1955
T. dampfi Alexander, 1927
T. dasytes Alexander, 1962
T. decora Alexander, 1920
T. dedecora Alexander, 1936
T. delandi Alexander, 1941
T. denuda Alexander, 1943
T. desdemona Alexander, 1949
T. determinata Osten Sacken, 1888
T. diacantha Alexander, 1979
T. diana Alexander, 1944
T. dilatipes Alexander, 1979
T. dileuca Alexander, 1947
T. dimelanocycla Alexander, 1973
T. diperone Alexander, 1969
T. diplaca Alexander, 1945
T. distifurca Alexander, 1943
T. diversipes Alexander, 1960
T. ducalis Alexander, 1949
T. duidensis Alexander, 1931
T. duncani Alexander, 1946
T. egens Alexander, 1952
T. elissa Alexander, 1948
T. eremnopoda Alexander, 1969
T. felicita Alexander, 1969
T. femorata de Meijere, 1916
T. fenestrata Osten Sacken, 1888
T. flavithorax (Wiedemann, 1821)
T. flavocincta Alexander, 1980
T. flavofimbria Alexander, 1968
T. foersteri Alexander, 1952
T. formosissima Alexander, 1947
T. fulgens Alexander, 1913
T. fulvinota Alexander, 1962
T. fulviventris Alexander, 1970
T. furva Alexander, 1930
T. fuscoapicalis Alexander, 1937
T. galatea Alexander, 1949
T. glabripes de Meijere, 1913
T. gorana Alexander, 1948
T. gowdeyi Alexander, 1928
T. gracilis Osten Sacken, 1886
T. gudalurensis Alexander, 1950
T. gurneyana Alexander, 1950
T. hera Alexander, 1949
T. hilaris Alexander, 1913
T. holomelania Alexander, 1979
T. homilacantha Alexander, 1968
T. hondurensis Alexander, 1941
T. hypomela Alexander, 1948
T. idiophallus Alexander, 1942
T. immaculata Alexander, 1922
T. immaculipleura Alexander, 1947
T. inca Alexander, 1968
T. inepta Alexander, 1942
T. inermis Alexander, 1969
T. inornata Riedel, 1918
T. insolita Alexander, 1979
T. inulta Alexander, 1936
T. invaripes Alexander, 1936
T. iriomotensis Alexander, 1935
T. jaliscana Alexander, 1947
T. jivaro Alexander, 1944
T. jocosa Alexander, 1913
T. jucunda Alexander, 1913
T. kiangsiensis Alexander, 1937
T. laeta Alexander, 1913
T. laidis Alexander, 1966
T. lais Alexander, 1947
T. laterospinosa Alexander, 1937
T. latibasalis Alexander, 1968
T. lauta Alexander, 1949
T. laxa Alexander, 1947
T. leonora Alexander, 1938
T. leridensis Alexander, 1934
T. lethe Alexander, 1947
T. lineipleura Alexander, 1949
T. lipacantha Alexander, 1969
T. liponeura Alexander, 1937
T. lipophleps Alexander, 1937
T. longisetosa Alexander, 1941
T. longispina Alexander, 1938
T. lucida Alexander, 1916
T. ludicra Alexander, 1949
T. lugubris Alexander, 1914
T. luteicolor Alexander, 1942
T. majuscula Alexander, 1931
T. manniana Alexander, 1947
T. marticola Alexander, 1931
T. megaphallus Alexander, 1968
T. megaspatha Alexander, 1969
T. melanocephala (Fabricius, 1787)
T. melanoderma Alexander, 1980
T. mendax Alexander, 1920
T. meridiana Skuse, 1890
T. metamelania Alexander, 1973
T. metatibiata Alexander, 1969
T. miniata Alexander, 1930
T. minuta Alexander, 1926
T. molesta Osten Sacken, 1886
T. morionella (Schiner, 1868)
T. multispinosa Alexander, 1944
T. munda Alexander, 1913
T. myersi Alexander, 1926
T. mythica Alexander, 1926
T. nebulipennis Alexander, 1928
T. neoleridensis Alexander, 1940
T. neosalva Alexander, 1943
T. nigerrima Edwards, 1916
T. nigrirostris Alexander, 1948
T. nigroclavaria Alexander, 1946
T. nigrocorporis Alexander, 1937
T. nigrocostata Alexander, 1939
T. nigropostica Alexander, 1938
T. nigrosignata Alexander, 1931
T. nocticolor Edwards, 1919
T. noctula Alexander, 1971
T. nocturna Alexander, 1941
T. nodipes Speiser, 1913
T. omissa Alexander, 1921
T. omissinervis Alexander, 1921
T. ornata Brunetti, 1918
T. oteroi Alexander, 1936
T. pabulatoria Alexander, 1920
T. pahangensis Edwards, 1928
T. paraplecioides Alexander, 1960
T. paraxantha Alexander, 1962
T. parishiana Alexander, 1930
T. patens Alexander, 1939
T. perangusta Alexander, 1939
T. perbasalis Alexander, 1949
T. perebenina Alexander, 1979
T. perlata Alexander, 1943
T. perproducta Alexander, 1969
T. phaeostigmosa Alexander, 1980
T. pilipes (Walker, 1856)
T. platyphallus Alexander, 1945
T. plecioides de Meijere, 1913
T. pleuralis Alexander, 1913
T. pleurolinea Alexander, 1959
T. podagra Alexander, 1952
T. polita Osten Sacken, 1888
T. portoricana Alexander, 1936
T. progne Alexander, 1950
T. projecta Alexander, 1949
T. pruthiana Alexander, 1942
T. pulchella Alexander, 1913
T. quinquemaculata Alexander, 1925
T. rectangularis Alexander, 1952
T. rectispina Alexander, 1968
T. reginae Alexander, 1931
T. retusa Alexander, 1935
T. rhabdophora Alexander, 1942
T. rostrata Enderlein, 1912
T. rubescens Alexander, 1914
T. rubriceps Alexander, 1937
T. rubroatra Alexander, 1962
T. rufula Alexander, 1947
T. rutilans Alexander, 1932
T. sackeni Alexander, 1913
T. salti Alexander, 1930
T. salva Alexander, 1942
T. sanguinea Alexander, 1938
T. scabrosa Alexander, 1938
T. scapularis (Macquart, 1838)
T. schineri Enderlein, 1912
T. schistostyla Alexander, 1969
T. scitamenta Alexander, 1931
T. semiermis Alexander, 1980
T. sentosa Alexander, 1969
T. seposita Alexander, 1941
T. serrulifera Alexander, 1945
T. seticosta Alexander, 1948
T. setigera Alexander, 1973
T. shanensis Alexander, 1952
T. siamensis Edwards, 1928
T. sigmoidea Alexander, 1949
T. simplex (Wiedemann, 1828)
T. solivaga Alexander, 1952
T. solomonensis Alexander, 1950
T. spica Alexander, 1943
T. spinigera Schiner, 1868
T. stadelmanni Alexander, 1945
T. strictispina Alexander, 1968
T. strumosa Alexander, 1942
T. stygica Alexander, 1914
T. subanthracina Alexander, 1949
T. subargentea Alexander, 1948
T. subclara Alexander, 1971
T. subfurva Alexander, 1966
T. subgalatea Alexander, 1959
T. subinulta Alexander, 1979
T. subjocosa Alexander, 1942
T. sublaxa Alexander, 1980
T. subleridensis Alexander, 1938
T. submolesta Alexander, 1930
T. submunda Alexander, 1941
T. subpatens Alexander, 1966
T. subpulchella Alexander, 1959
T. subrubriceps Alexander, 1945
T. sultana Alexander, 1938
T. susainathani Alexander, 1950
T. tactilis Alexander, 1952
T. taino Alexander, 1964
T. talamancana Alexander, 1939
T. tartarus Alexander, 1949
T. tenella Alexander, 1970
T. thurmani Alexander, 1954
T. trifasciata Enderlein, 1912
T. tristis Alexander, 1913
T. tullochi Alexander, 1945
T. turrialbensis Alexander, 1945
T. unicingulata Alexander, 1944
T. unicolor Riedel, 1918
T. vacuata Alexander, 1980
T. varipes Alexander, 1980
T. venezuelensis (Macquart, 1846)
T. volentis Alexander, 1952
T. walkeriana Alexander, 1953
T. wighti Alexander, 1939
T. wilhelminae Alexander, 1947
T. wirthiana Alexander, 1969
T. xantha Alexander, 1953
T. yezoensis Alexander, 1924

References

Limoniidae